WFSX-FM (92.5 MHz, "92.5 Right All Along") is a commercial radio station licensed to Estero, Florida, and serving the Fort Myers-Naples area of Southwest Florida.  It is owned by Sun Broadcasting and it airs a talk radio format.  The radio studios and offices are on Bonita Beach Road in Bonita Springs.

WFSX-FM has an effective radiated power (ERP) of 20,500 watts.  The transmitter is off Old 41 Road in Bonita Springs.  WFSX-FM broadcasts using HD Radio technology.  The HD2 digital subchannel carries Fox Sports Radio programming and feeds FM translator W290DB at 105.9 MHz.

Programming
On weekdays, WFSX-FM broadcasts two local talk shows, in mornings "Daybreak with Drew Steele" and in afternoon drive time, "The Drive with Trey Radel."  The rest of the schedule is nationally syndicated talk shows from Glenn Beck, Sean Hannity, "The Clay Travis and Buck Sexton Show," Mark Levin, Dan Bongino and "Coast to Coast AM with George Noory."  

Weekends feature specialty shows on money, health, boating, law and technology, as well as repeats of weekday shows.  Syndicated weekend hosts include Kim Komando, Chris Plante, Bill Cunningham, "Bill Handel on the Law" and "The Weekend with Michael Brown."  Most hours begin with an update from Fox News Radio.

History

Country, Oldies and Talk
It was originally licensed to LaBelle, Florida, as WVHG at 92.1 MHz. It was owned by LaBelle Broadcasting with an effective radiated power of 3,000 watts, airing a country music format.  

In the 1990s and early 2000s, the station went through several changes in call letters and ownership.  In the late 1990s, it entered into a country music simulcast arrangement with 92.9 WIKX Punta Gorda.  On March 26, 2008, the station switched to an oldies format, playing 1960s and 70s hits. Six days later, the call sign was changed to WNTY.

On September 17, 2009, the station flipped to a news-talk format, branded under the on-air name "92.5 Fox News". On September 25, 2009, WNTY changed its call letters to WFSX-FM, to go with its "Fox News" branding.

Simulcasting 
WFSX-FM's programming was once simulcast on WNOG (1270 AM) in Naples, Florida, and WFSX (1240 AM) in Fort Myers. As of July 22, 2013, Fox News programming is no longer available on 1240 AM and 1270 AM.  

Those stations changed to a sports radio format.  The Fort Myers station became WFWN, subsequently returning to the WFSX call sign in 2016.  WFSX’s license at 1240 AM was cancelled on January 4, 2022 but the sports programming continues on 92.5 HD2 and on 105.9 FM, as well as WNOG 1270 and its translators.

Translators

WFSX-FM broadcasts its HD2 subchannel on the following translator:

References

External links
Official Website
Broadcast Center | Fort Myers Broadcasting Co. | Sun Broadcasting, Inc.

FSX-FM
News and talk radio stations in the United States
1979 establishments in Florida
Radio stations established in 1979